Deer Reserve National Park is a nature reserve in the Somerset Region of Queensland, in the South East Queensland bioregion. The name "Deer Reserve" refers to a gift of red deer to the Cressbrook Station. Plants protected in  Deer Reserve National Park and the adjoining Deer Reserve State Forest include Plectranthus leiperi. It covers an area of 32.3 square kilometers. It is located 480 meters above sea level.

References

Nature reserves in Queensland
Year of establishment missing